Thicket Portage station is a flag stop station in Thicket Portage, Manitoba, Canada.

Rail Line
The stop is served by Via Rail's Winnipeg – Churchill train.

Train Frequency
The station used to be served by 13-14 trains per week, in recent time this has been reduced to 6 trains per week.

Footnotes

External links 
Via Rail Station Information

Via Rail stations in Manitoba